List of champions of the 1884 U.S. National Championships (now known as the US Open). The tournament was held from August 26 to August 27 on the outdoor grass courts at the Newport Casino in Newport, Rhode Island. It was the 4th U.S. National Championships and the second Grand Slam tournament of the year.

Finals

Singles

 Richard D. Sears defeated  Howard Taylor 6–0, 1–6, 6–0, 6–2

Doubles

 Richard D. Sears /  James Dwight defeated  Walter Berry /  Alexander Van Rensselaer, 6–4, 6–1, 8–10, 6–4

References

External links
Official US Open website

 
U.S. National Championships
U.S. National Championships (tennis) by year
U.S. National Championships (tennis)
U.S. National Championships (tennis)